Sidney Duteil (born Patrick Duteil in 1955), better known as Sidney, is a French musician, rapper, DJ, television and radio host, and occasional actor of Guadeloupean origin.  

Duteil was born in Argenteuil, Val-d'Oise. He is well known in France for his connection with the beginnings of the French hip hop scene. He presented a hip hop radio program on Radio 7 starting in 1982. In 1984, he was the host of the popular weekly French Rap television show entitled H.I.P. H.O.P.  This was significant for two reasons: first because Duteil became the first Black man in France to hold such a position, and secondly because the birth and eventual popularity of the weekly show demonstrated the growing admiration and involvement in the French population in hip hop culture.

In 1990, Sidney collaborated with David Guetta in his early career to release "Nation Rap."

References

External links 
 Biography 

1955 births
Living people
People from Argenteuil
French people of Guadeloupean descent
French hip hop musicians
French television presenters
French radio presenters
French hip hop DJs